The 1905 Rhode Island gubernatorial election was held on November 7, 1905. Incumbent Republican George H. Utter defeated Democratic nominee Lucius F. C. Garvin with 53.30% of the vote.

General election

Candidates
Major party candidates
George H. Utter, Republican
Lucius F. C. Garvin, Democratic

Other candidates
Bernan E. Helme, Prohibition
Thomas F. Herrick, Socialist Labor
Warren A. Carpenter, Socialist

Results

References

1905
Rhode Island
Gubernatorial